Bruce Bernard Geller (October 13, 1930 – May 21, 1978) was an American lyricist, screenwriter, director, and television producer.

Life and education
Geller was born in New York City, the son of Dorothy (Friedlander) and General Sessions Judge Abraham N. Geller. Geller graduated from Yale University in 1952, where he had studied psychology and sociology and was involved in many activities including theater.

Career 
He pursued a career writing scripts for shows on the DuMont Television Network including Jimmy Hughes, Rookie Cop (1953) and others. He also wrote the book and lyrics for musical theatre productions including Livin' the Life (1957) and All in Love (1961), but his efforts met with only modest success. Geller left New York for Los Angeles, where he was employed writing scripts for episodes of several television series, including  Zane Grey Theater, Have Gun, Will Travel, The Rebel, and The Rifleman. He also worked as the co-executive producer of the Rawhide  series for the 1964-1965 television season.

While producing Rawhide, he developed the idea for a new "cloak-and-dagger" series, Mission: Impossible. In 1966, Geller created, wrote, produced, and directed Mission: Impossible, the accomplishment for which he is best remembered. The show ran on CBS from 1966 to 1973 and earned him an Emmy Award in 1966 as producer plus another for Outstanding Writing Achievement in Drama. During the early seasons, a photograph of Geller was included in the dossier of Impossible Missions Force (IMF) agents that IMF leaders Briggs and Phelps perused each week and was often visible on screen (such as in the episodes "Memory", "Operation Rogosh" and "Operation - Heart"). The series was revived in 1988 and aired until 1990 on ABC.

Geller also wrote, produced, and directed for the series Mannix (1967–1975), which was twice nominated for an Emmy Award. In 1973, he made his only venture into feature films, producing and directing Harry in Your Pocket starring James Coburn and Walter Pidgeon.

Death 
A flying enthusiast, Bruce Geller died when the Cessna Skymaster he was piloting ran into fog and crashed into Buena Vista Canyon near Santa Barbara, California. He is interred in Mount Sinai Memorial Park Cemetery in Los Angeles.

References

External links

1930 births
1978 deaths
American male screenwriters
Television producers from New York City
American musical theatre lyricists
Writers from New York City
Aviators killed in aviation accidents or incidents in the United States
Yale University alumni
Accidental deaths in California
Burials at Mount Sinai Memorial Park Cemetery
20th-century American businesspeople
Songwriters from New York (state)
Screenwriters from New York (state)
20th-century American male writers
Victims of aviation accidents or incidents in 1978
20th-century American screenwriters